Lieutenant-General Sir John Harvey,  (23 April 1778 – 22 March 1852) was a British Army officer and a lieutenant governor.

He was commissioned into the 80th Foot in 1794 and served in several different locations, including France, Egypt, and India. He came to Canada in 1813 and served as a lieutenant colonel in the War of 1812, taking part in the British victories at the Battle of Stoney Creek and the Battle of Crysler's Farm in Ontario.

From 1836 to 1837, he was the Lieutenant Governor of Prince Edward Island. From 1837 to 1841, he was the Lieutenant Governor of New Brunswick. From 1841 to 1846, he was the Civil Governor of Newfoundland. From 1846 to 1852, he was the Lieutenant Governor of Nova Scotia.

Legacy 

Harvey, York County, New Brunswick, founded in 1837 when he was Lieutenant-Governor of New Brunswick, is named for him.

Harvey Park in Hamilton, Ontario, is named after him.

Former Harvey Township (now amalgamated with Galway-Cavendish and Harvey Township), Peterborough County, Ontario, is named after him.

There is a monument to him in St. Paul's Church (Halifax).  He is buried in Fort Massey Cemetery.

Amelia Clotilda Jennings wrote a poem for him upon his death.

See also
List of lieutenant governors of Nova Scotia
 Governors of Newfoundland
List of people of Newfoundland and Labrador

References

External links
Biography at Government House The Governorship of Newfoundland and Labrador

|ColSpan=3|Note: The year after Sir John Harvey had stepped down as governor of Newfoundland and when Sir John Le Marchant was appointed, the colony was administered by Robert Law, a British Army officer.

(acting)

1778 births
1852 deaths
British Army lieutenant generals
59th Regiment of Foot officers
South Staffordshire Regiment officers
Governors of Newfoundland Colony
Knights Commander of the Order of the Bath
Lieutenant Governors of the Colony of Prince Edward Island
Lieutenant Governors of New Brunswick
Lieutenant Governors of Nova Scotia
British people of the War of 1812
Persons of National Historic Significance (Canada)